The following highways are numbered 330:

Canada
 Manitoba Provincial Road 330
 New Brunswick Route 330
 Newfoundland and Labrador Route 330
 Nova Scotia Route 330
 Prince Edward Island Route 330

China
 China National Highway 330

Costa Rica
 National Route 330

India
 National Highway 330 (India)

Japan
 Japan National Route 330

United States
  U.S. Route 330 (former)
  Arkansas Highway 330
  California State Route 330
  Colorado State Highway 330
  Georgia State Route 330
  Indiana State Road 330 (former)
  Iowa Highway 330
  Kentucky Route 330
  Louisiana Highway 330
  Maryland Route 330
  Minnesota State Highway 330
  Mississippi Highway 330
  Montana Secondary Highway 330
  New Mexico State Road 330
 New York:
  New York State Route 330 (former)
  County Route 330 (Erie County, New York)
  Ohio State Route 330
  Puerto Rico Highway 330
  Tennessee State Route 330
 Texas:
  Texas State Highway 330 (former)
  Texas State Highway Spur 330
  Farm to Market Road 330
  Virginia State Route 330
  Virginia State Route 330 (former)
  Wyoming Highway 330